Brouillette is a surname of French origin. People with this name include:

Dan Brouillette (born 1962), American politician and businessman
Geneviève Brouillette (born 1969), French Canadian television and film actress
Jason Brouillette, see Shooting of Jeremy Mardis
Jessica Brouillette (born 1995), a Canadian freestyle wrestler
Julien Brouillette (born 1986), a Canadian former professional ice hockey player
Marc-Olivier Brouillette (born 1986), a retired Canadian football linebacker
Matthew Brouillette (born 1969), an American businessman and entrepreneur
Pierre-A. Brouillette (born 1951), a Quebec politician and businessman
Richard Brouillette (born 1970), a Quebec film producer, director, editor and programmer

Surnames of French origin